Radie Britain (17 March 189923 May 1994) was a Texas-born pianist, writer, music educator and composer of symphonic music.

Life
Radie Britain was born near Silverton, Texas, the daughter of Edgar Charles and Katie (Ford) Britain. She studied at Clarendon College in Texas, and at the American Conservatory in Chicago with Heniot Levy, graduating with a Bachelor of Music degree in piano in 1921. After completing her degree, Britain taught music for a year at Clarendon College and privately in Amarillo. In 1922 she studied with organist Pietro Yon in Dallas, in 1923 with Marcel Dupré in Paris, and in 1924 with Adele Aus der Ohe in Berlin and Albert Noelte in Munich who encouraged her to pursue composition. She made her debut as a composer in Munich in May 1926. She returned to Texas after the death of her sister, and later taught at the Girvin Institute of Music and Allied Arts in Chicago. She composed orchestral works in the tradition of German post-romanticism during these years.

Britain's Heroic Poem (1929) won the Juilliard National Publication Prize in 1930. With the assistance from the Federal Music Project, her works were played by symphony orchestras for a decade. She married Chicago businessman Leslie Edward Moeller in 1930 and had a daughter Lerae in 1932. Britain spent the summers of 1935 and 1936 at the famed MacDowell Colony. The couple divorced in 1939, and she moved to Hollywood, California, and married Italian sculptor Edgardo Simone in 1940. In 1941, Britain settled in Hollywood, continued career as Texas composer, and received international or national awards. She was given an honorary doctorate by the Musical Arts Conservatory in Amarillo in 1958. After Simone died in 1949, Britain wrote an unpublished autobiographical novel, Bravo, based on her relationship with him. She married aviation pioneer Theodore Morton in 1959. She died in Palm Desert, California, and her papers are housed at several locations.

Works
Britain incorporated musical idioms from the southwestern United States into her compositions. Selected orchestral works include:
Angel Chimes
Brothers of the Clouds with TTBB chorus
The Builders with SATB chorus
Cactus Rhapsody
Chicken in the Rough
Chipmunks for woodwinds, harp, percussion
Cosmic Mist Symphony
Cowboy Rhapsody
Drouth
The Earth Does Not Wish for Beauty with SATB chorus
Earth of God (String Orchestra)
Les Fameux Douze The Famous Twelve for small orchestra
Four Sarabandes for small orchestra
Franciscan Sketches
San Luis Rey
Saint Francis of Assisi
Heroic Poem
Infant Suite
In Living Ecstasy  with solo voice
Jewels of Lake Tahoe
Kambu
Lament with solo violin
Little per cent
Minha Terra
Mother: A Melody of Love with narrator
Nisan with SATB chorus

References

1899 births
1994 deaths
20th-century classical composers
20th-century American composers
20th-century women composers
20th-century American women musicians
20th-century American musicians
American classical composers
American women classical composers
American music educators
American women music educators
American Conservatory of Music alumni
Clarendon College (Texas) alumni
Classical musicians from Texas
Educators from Texas
MacDowell Colony fellows
People from Briscoe County, Texas